Giuseppe Torriani (10 December 1904 – 21 January 1942) was an Italian professional footballer who played as a forward.

External links 
Profile at MagliaRossonera.it 
Profile at MyJuve.it

1904 births
1942 deaths
Italian footballers
Association football forwards
Serie A players
Juventus F.C. players
A.C. Milan players